Hasanpaşa is a Turkish compound word consisting of Hasan and Paşa (Pasha in English). It may refer to:

 Hasanpaşa, a town in Burdur Province, Turkey
 Hasanpaşa, İnegöl, a village in Bursa Province, Turkey
 Hasanpaşa Gasworks, a former gasworks, redeveloped into a museum, in Istanbul Province, Turkey
 Hasanpaşa Han, a historical caravanserai in Ankara, Turkey

See also 
 Hasan Pasha (disambiguation)